The canton of Gardanne is an administrative division of the Bouches-du-Rhône department, in southeastern France. At the French canton reorganisation which came into effect in March 2015, it was expanded from 4 to 5 communes. Its seat is in Gardanne.

It consists of the following communes: 
Gardanne 
Mimet
Les Pennes-Mirabeau
Septèmes-les-Vallons
Simiane-Collongue

References

Cantons of Bouches-du-Rhône